The 1956 Campeonato Argentino de Rugby  was won by the selection of Buenos Aires Province ("Provincia") that beat in the final the selection of La Plata.

Twelve team participated, because the club of Santa Fè Province left the Unión de Rugby del Río Paranà founding the Unión santafesina de rugby.
Cause the contemporary Oxford-Cambridge combined tour, "Provincia" and "Capital" selection were directly admitted to semifinals

Rugby Union in Argentina in 1956
 The Buenos Aires Champsionship was won by C.A.S.I.
 The Cordoba Province Championship was won by Universitario Cordoba and Jockey Club Córdoba
 The North-East Championship was won by Tucumán RC
 A mixed selection, formed also of many international player of British national team, student at Oxford and Cambridge universities visit Argentina, for the second historical tour, the second after the tours in 1948- The visitors won \0 match on 11, and 2 test on 2 againsta Argentina.

Knock out stages

Final

Bibliography 
  Memorias de la UAR 1956
  XII Campeonato Argentino

Campeonato Argentino de Rugby
Argentina
Rugby